St. Louis Regional Airport  is a public airport four miles (6 km) east of Alton, in Madison County, Illinois, United States. It is in the village of Bethalto but its mailing address is East Alton.

Its operations are paid for by an airport taxation district created in 1946, which collects taxes from property owners in the Madison County townships of Alton, Wood River, Foster and Fort Russell.

History 
Civic Memorial Airport opened in 1946 and received its current name in 1984.

Facilities
The  airfield sits at 544 ft (166 m) MSL. It has an 8,099 by 150 ft (2,469 by 46 m) runway that runs roughly east–west (11/29) and a 6,500 by 100 ft (1,981 by 30 m) crosswind runway that runs north–south (17/35). With an ILS approach and tower controlled class D airspace, the facility can accommodate a Boeing 747.

For the 12-month period ending April 30, 2017, the airport had 39,828 aircraft operations, an average of 109 per day: 85% general aviation, 13% air taxi, 2% military and less than 1% commercial service. In March 2018, there were 79 aircraft based at this airport: 73 single-engine, 4 multi-engine and 2 jet.

West Star Aviation is the largest fixed-base operations (FBO) company at the airport. In 2008, Premiere Air changed its name to West Star aviation, and the company has remained since that time. The company provides a wide range of services from engine repair, interior and exterior paint services, avionics installation and repair, refurbishing, aircraft part sales, and airframe inspections.

The airport is popular with blimp crews, being a frequent stop for blimps on transcontinental flights across the United States.

References

External links 
 St. Louis Regional Airport, official website
 West Star Aviation
 

Airports in Illinois
Airports established in 1946
Metro East
Airports in Greater St. Louis
Transportation buildings and structures in Madison County, Illinois